The Tanglin Club is a social club in Singapore and is known to be one of the finest private members' clubs in Asia since its founding in 1865.

The opening of the Suez Canal in 1869 and the advent of steamers resulted in a travel revolution. The small port founded by Sir Thomas Stamford Raffles, the founder of Singapore, developed into a thriving trading centre, and the everyday life of the British settlement had become more sophisticated, and exclusively European.

In October 1865, "forty good men and true" convened a meeting for the purpose of forming a suburban social club to meet the wants of the British living in the settlement, and founded the Tanglin Club. A property in the District of Claymore was purchased in 1866 and this is the current site of the Tanglin Club today.

For many years, the Tanglin Club was one of the pillars of social life in Singapore for successful members of the European community. By the late 1930s, its ballroom had the reputation of having the best dance floor in the island and the Club band was a focal point of attraction. The highlight of Singapore's social calendar was The Tanglin Ball. Even today, the ball is held yearly in the Churchill Room, an icon of the Club.

Before the fall of Singapore in February 1942, the Club was prepared for use as a convalescent depot for the Malayan Armed Service and an evacuee centre. During the Japanese occupation, the Club was used as a Japanese officers' club. Having survived the vicissitudes of debt and war, age and apathy, even a major transformation, the Tanglin Club still retains an aura of exclusivity as one of the premier social clubs in Singapore today.

Having grown from "Forty Good Men" to over 4,000 Members, the Club prides itself on its international and cosmopolitan nature with more than 70 nationalities among its Members. It has earned a reputation of prestige and quality. The Tanglin Club Membership is still very much sought after as it offers excellent facilities and a distinguished lifestyle to its Members.

The presidents of the Tanglin Club were persons of prominence such that there are many streets named after them, for instance, Dunman Road, Anderson Road & Bridge, Read Street & Bridge, Birch Road, Bishopsgate and Finlayson Green.

The Tanglin Club today is an inviting oasis for relaxation and rejuvenation while its ambience still evokes the grace and charm of the past.

History
The Tanglin Club was founded in 1865 to cater to the social and recreational needs of locally based British officials and expatriates. That year, an interim committee was formed, and it comprised Thomas Dunman (President), Herbert Buchanan (Vice-President), Lancelot C. Masfen, Jos. M. Webster, William Mulholland, Walter Oldham, Edwin A. G. C. Cooke and John R. Forrester. Although race was not stipulated as a criterion for membership, only Europeans were admitted. Club members however, were mainly British. While the exact foundation date of the Tanglin Club is uncertain, it is suspected that the date which had been determined by the Tanglin Club Centenary Celebrations Committee in 1865 was the most convenient day to hold the celebrations. Two letters, which appeared in the Singapore Daily Times on 11 and 13 November 1865, allude to the formation of the club, and that in October 1865, legal documents show without doubt this club to be the Tanglin Club.

On 26 June 1866, a property was purchased in the District of Claymore from Arthur Hughes de Wind for 600 dollars. In December 1866, the trustees of the club borrowed 5,000 Spanish dollars to build a clubhouse with bowling alleys, billiards rooms and stables.

The club was possibly named after a Tanglin tree where one might be growing on the spot where the clubhouse stood.

About two years after its founding, the club's management committee was unable to repay the first installment of 2,000 Spanish dollars, which was due on 30 November 1868. The costs of construction of the clubhouse and the provision of amenities combined with the expenses involved in running the club must have placed a tremendous burden on its financial resources. The financial strain was made worse when the second installment of the principal mortgage sum was due on 30 November 1871; the club was again unable to pay both that and the sum of 2,000 dollars.

Ten years after the loan of 5,000 dollars was drawn, the club could not afford to repay any of the principal sum borrowed. Even the staff's wages were left unpaid.

An extraordinary general meeting of the club was then called on 20 June 1876 to resolve the club's indebtedness. The meeting passed four resolutions, including appointing a committee to enquire and report to an adjournment of this meeting whether any person will advance 5,000 dollars on a mortgage of the club, and that a Member be appointed to purchase the property and re-mortgage the whole property to the new mortgage. No records of subsequent meetings are available but it is evident that the Tanglin Club literally went under the hammer.

The club continued to function notwithstanding the charge and conveyance of its property, but likely only so because of the somewhat complex financial arrangement that had been devised to permit the continued use of the club and its facilities by its members. The saga of the original loan of 5,000 dollars continued until nearly the turn of the last century when the club's membership numbered around two hundred. In 1899, the club's indebtedness arising from this loan was finally totally discharged.

By the 1890s, the Claymore district had evolved into a prestigious district occupied by many prominent European residents. During the construction of the German Teutonia Club (present-day Goodwood Park Hotel), the Tanglin Club accommodated the Teutonia members. When the palatial Teutonia Club was completed in 1900, it quickly overshadowed the old and dismal looking the Tanglin Club. The Tanglin Club's German membership had dwindled from a strong number of 236 a decade ago to 181 in 1911. When World War I broke out in 1914, Teutonia Club was declared an enemy property.

Several years after the end of the First World War in the early 1920s, the Tanglin Club purchased additional blocks of land. However, the good fortune of the Club was short-lived towards the end of the 1920s. The Great Depression had begun, and the finances of the club were severely strained.

During the Japanese occupation, the Tanglin Club was used by the Japanese army as a club for their officers. The club was also used as a base for their propaganda unit as well as their storage area for rations and weapons. After the Japanese surrender, the Tanglin Club came under the management of the Navy, Army and Air Force Institutes (NAAFI) until March 1946. It was not until 1 September 1946 that the club was informally reopened.

The men who gathered in the dining room of the Singapore Club on 21 May 1946 faced a daunting task – to reinstate the Tanglin Club, an institution founded seventy-five years earlier as a premier establishment – like the ‘forty good men and true’ who had met in 1865. The dedication of the post-war committee paid off; despite the difficulties faced, the club reopened informally on 1 September 1946, with 182 Ordinary Members, including 127 pre-war registered members, 23 lady members and provision for up to 300 service members.

During the 1950s, the club consolidated its finances and continued to build up its membership. By September 1950, the membership stood at 1,309 – including 13 life and honorary members – and the waiting list was temporarily closed for the first time after the war.

The last significant event in the years leading to the centenary of the Tanglin Club in 1965 concerned the opening of membership. Although the rules of the club did not specifically deny membership on the grounds of race, but in practice, the club was British. In 1959, the elected government decided to eliminate the advantage enjoyed by citizens of the United Kingdom and British colonies in their eligibility for Singapore citizenship. An amended citizenship bill passed in May 1960 disallowed dual nationality and made the period of residence to qualify for Singapore citizenship eight years for all applicants, including British subjects.

In 1962, the government appealed to clubs in Singapore to have at least 50% Singaporean membership. After an extraordinary general meeting, the club's membership rule was amended to admit all races.

In 1971, the completion of the pull out of the British forces stationed in Singapore signaled the end of a tradition in membership and association extended by the Tanglin Club from its founding. At a special meeting of Members on 3 May 1973, the category of Service membership was deleted from the club rules. By October 1978, the membership stood at 2,561 with 498 on the waiting list.

Traditionally, women paid lower membership fees but were not given voting rights. It was only in April 1995 that women who were full members were accorded equal voting privileges in the club. Due to the club's constitution that capped Singaporean membership to 51%, the waiting time for Singaporeans has been known to be as long as 25 years.

The construction of a new four-storey clubhouse was carried out in phases since September 1977 and was completed in March 1981. On 14 March 1981, members bade farewell to the original clubhouse at a closing ceremony. Before the old clubhouse was demolished, memorabilia from the old building were auctioned off in support of the Children's Charity Association of Singapore. More than a month later, on 25 April 1998, the present clubhouse was officially opened by the then Minister for Law Edmund W. Barker. Over the years, the clubhouse had been upgraded to cater to members' needs. In 2005, the club embarked on a $21 million upgrading plan that included the construction of a new sports complex.

During the 125th Anniversary celebrations of 1990, the then general committee carried out the interment of a time capsule. Containing various items of historical interest for future historians, the time capsule has rested undisturbed and shall not be opened till the 200th anniversary of the club in October 2065.

To commemorate 150 year anniversary, events and promotions were featured throughout the year.

On 9 October 2015, Children's Day, the club hosted a poolside carnival for approximately 150 disadvantaged children. To make this event more special, members volunteered to lend a helping hand during the carnival. On the same day, the club held a specially commissioned 150th celebratory musical, ‘The Tanglin Tree’, composed by John Sharpley, with lyrics by Tanglin Club member Robert Yeo. Over forty artists joined hands to create this unique Tanglin production. In honour of the club's official color, a Club-wide celebration ‘Hallow’green’ on 31 October 2015 was thrown.

Committee members also planted a Tanglin tree at the poolside area on 14 December 2015.

A charity drive raised a total of nearly $450,000, from members who contributed to this initiative. During the club's Charity Black Tie Gala Dinner in November 2015, a cheque of $195,975 was presented to Singapore President Tony Tan for the President's Challenge. By December 2015, the final donation to the President's Challenge amounted to $220,625. $73,550 was donated to Food from the Heart; $73,550 was donated to the Kidney Dialysis Foundation; $73,525 was donated to Focus on the Family Singapore. Aside from the Charity Drive, $5,762 was donated to the club's adopted charity for 2015, Dover Park Hospice.

References

External links
Official Club Website

Clubs and societies in Singapore
Gentlemen's clubs in Singapore
1865 establishments in Singapore
19th-century architecture in Singapore